Isabel Peña Domingo (born 1983) is a Spanish screenwriter. She often works in tandem with Rodrigo Sorogoyen.

Biography 
Born in 1983 in Zaragoza, she became a fan of classical cinema when she was very young. She earned a degree in Comunicación Audiovisual from the University of Navarre and a degree in scriptwriting from the Escuela de Cinematografía y del Audiovisual de la Comunidad de Madrid (ECAM).

She worked for the first time with Sorogoyen (whom she had met at the ECAM) in the screenwriting team of the television series Impares.

Works 

Film
 2013: Stockholm
 2016: Que Dios nos perdone (May God Save Us)
 2018: El reino (The Realm).
 2019: Madre (Mother)
 2022: As bestas (The Beasts)
 2022: Jaula (The Chalk Line)
 : El llanto

Television
  (17 episodes, 2008).
  (32 episodes, 2009).
 La pecera de Eva (57 episodes, 2010).
  (2018).
 Antidisturbios (2020; also credited as "creator")

Accolades

References 

Spanish women screenwriters
1983 births
Goya Award winners
Living people
21st-century Spanish screenwriters